These organizations were at one time called the Single tax party:

Justice Party of Denmark
Single Tax Party of the USA